Jerry Simmons may refer to:

 Jerry Simmons (tennis), former head men's tennis coach at Louisiana State University
 Jerry Simmons (American football) (born 1942), former American football wide receiver
 Jerry Simmons (American football coach) (born 1954), former American football strength and conditioning coach